Carson station is a below grade busway station on the J Line of the Los Angeles Metro Busway system. The station is located on the shoulder of Interstate 110 at its intersection with Carson Street, after which the station is named, in Torrance, California.

It is one of two stations along the Harbor Freeway are outside of the Harbor Transitway, a shared busway and high occupancy toll lane. North of this station transitway services use Torrance Boulevard and Figueroa Street to the Harbor Gateway Transit Center. Traveling south on I-110 the next station is Pacific Coast Highway. 

The station uses two side platforms which are accessed from Carson Street via stairs and elevators. The station is close to the Harbor–UCLA Medical Center and has a 143 space park and ride lot.

Service

Station layout

Hours and frequency

Connections 
, the following connections are available:
 Los Angeles Metro Bus: , Express 
 Torrance Transit: 1, 3, Rapid 3

References

Los Angeles Metro Busway stations
Carson, California
J Line (Los Angeles Metro)
Transport infrastructure completed in 1996
1996 establishments in California
Buildings and structures in Carson, California
Bus stations in Los Angeles County, California